Toše Ončev (born 27 December 1996) is a Macedonian handball player who plays for GRK Ohrid.

References

1996 births
Living people
Macedonian male handball players
Sportspeople from Veles, North Macedonia